Thylaeodus rugulosus is a species of sea snail, a marine gastropod mollusk in the family Vermetidae, the worm snails or worm shells.

Description

Distribution

References

 Nordsieck, F. (1972). Marine Gastropoden aus der Shiqmona-Bucht in Israël. Archiv für Molluskenkunde der Senckenbergischen Naturforschenden Gesellschaft. 102(4-6): 227-245
 Bieler, R., 1995. Vermetid gastropods from Sao Miguel, Azores: Comparative anatomy, systematic position and biogeographic affiliation. Açoreana Supplement 1995: 173-192

External links
 Monterosato, T. A. (di). (1878). Enumerazione e sinonimia delle Conchiglie mediterranee. Giornale di scienze naturali ed economiche di Palermo. 13: 61-115

Vermetidae
Gastropods described in 1878